Giorgini is an Italian surname, derived from Giorgio (George). Notable people with the surname include:

Aldo Giorgini (1934–1994), Italian artist
Daniele Giorgini (born 1984), Italian tennis player
Frank Giorgini, American ceramist
Mass Giorgini (born 1968), American musician and record producer
Saskia Giorgini, Italian-Dutch pianist

See also
6775 Giorgini, a main-belt asteroid

Italian-language surnames
Patronymic surnames
Surnames from given names